The canton of Créon is an administrative division of the Gironde department, southwestern France. Its borders were modified at the French canton reorganisation which came into effect in March 2015. Its seat is in Créon.

It consists of the following communes:
 
Baurech
Bonnetan
Camarsac
Cambes
Camblanes-et-Meynac
Carignan-de-Bordeaux
Cénac
Créon
Croignon
Cursan
Fargues-Saint-Hilaire
Latresne
Lignan-de-Bordeaux
Loupes
Madirac
Pompignac
Le Pout
Quinsac
Sadirac
Saint-Caprais-de-Bordeaux
Saint-Genès-de-Lombaud
Sallebœuf
Tresses

References

Cantons of Gironde